The National Order of Merit (Spanish: Orden Nacional del Mérito) of Paraguay is an award given by the government of Paraguay. The award was first established in 1865 and can be given to any person or organization that has contributed in some way to the benefit of Paraguay. 

It is the highest distinction awarded by the Republic of Paraguay. The President of the Republic of Paraguay holds as a lifetime honour (unless removed by impeachment) the Grand Cross of the Order, known as Presidential Collar (or Cordon) of Marshal López.

About 
The National Order of Merit is given to a person or an organization who has contributed to the benefit of Paraguay in various fields of endeavor. This can include through culture, leadership, and science, among others.

The medal was designed as a five-pointed star with the words "honor et gloria" on the front and "premium meriti" on the reverse.

History 
The National Order of Merit was established on April 8, 1865 by Francisco Solano López. In 1867, López declared that women were eligible to earn the award. The award was based on the French Legion of Honor and had several different levels. The highest level was the Grand Cross. The other levels were Knight, Official, Commander and Grand Official.

On September 7, 1956, Law No. 394 was passed with several provisions regarding the awarding of the National Order of Merit.

Notable recipients 

 Roa Bastos, Paraguayan writer.
 Gildo Insfrán, Argentine politician.
 Shinichi Kitaoka, Japanese political scientist on behalf of the Japanese International Cooperation Agency (JICA).
 Eusebio Leal, Cuban historian.
 José Mujica, Uruguayan politician and president.
 Aloysio Nunes, Brazilian politician.
 Berta Rojas, Paraguyan musician.
 Luis Szarán, Paraguayan musician.
Lotte Schulz, Paraguayan artist.
Peter Tomlinson, South African admiral.
Augusto Pinochet, Chilean dictator.
 Fumihito, Prince Akishino, Japanese Crown Prince.
 former Princess Mako of Akishino, Japanese Princess.

References

External links 
 Republic of Paraguay: National Order of Merit

1865 establishments in South America
Awards established in 1865
Orders, decorations, and medals of Paraguay
Orders of merit